Camaxilo Airport  is an airport serving Camaxilo in Lunda Norte Province, Angola.

See also

 List of airports in Angola
 Transport in Angola

References

External links 
OpenStreetMap - Camaxilo
OurAirports - Camaxilo

Camaxilo